Jacqueline Anne Woodburne (born 5 February 1956) is a Northern Irish-born Australian actress, who is notable for her roles in TV soap operas. 

Since 1994, Woodburne has played teacher Susan Kennedy in Neighbours. She first became notable for her role in cult serial Prisoner as Julie "Chook" Egbert and also has featured in roles in soap operas including  The Young Doctors, Sons and Daughters, Cop Shop and The Flying Doctors.

Early life 

Woodburne was born in Carrickfergus, Northern Ireland. Her father was a member of the Royal Ulster Constabulary. She has two older siblings: John and Stephen. At the age of three, she emigrated with her family to Australia. The family assumed that her father would be able to join the Australian police on arrival, but, owing to various rules and regulations, he was unable to do so. Woodburne grew up in Frankston, Victoria and attended Forest Hill Primary School, Monterey Secondary College, and Karingal High School.

Career 

Alongside future Neighbours castmate Janet Andrewartha, Woodburne attended the National Theatre Drama School and graduated in 1980. Woodburne played Josie in the television miniseries Outbreak of Love. Woodburne starred in the ABC Film 1915 as Dianne, alongside Sigrid Thornton, Scott McGregor and Scott Burgess. Woodburne said the fighting is not the only focus of the miniseries, as it shows how the lives of the women were also affected by World War I. 

In 1990, she auditioned for the role of Pippa Fletcher in TV soap Home and Away, the producers looking for a recast after original portrayer Vanessa Downing left the series, but she lost out the role to Debra Lawrance.

Woodburne is best known for two long-running soap opera roles. The first was Julie "Chook" Egbert in Prisoner, a role she played from 1985 to 1986. A poem read by Julie in episode 582 of Prisoner was penned by Woodburne herself. This was followed by the role of Susan Kennedy in Neighbours, a role she has played since 1994.

Woodburne previously played the sister of Alan Fletcher's character in Cop Shop in 1982–1983, before they were cast as husband and wife Karl and Susan in Neighbours.

Other soap opera roles include a brief appearance in the very first episode of Sons and Daughters (playing the iconic Pat the Rat character - Patricia Dunne in flashbacks), a couple of episodes of A Country Practice, and a larger role in The Young Doctors where she played Nurse Maggie Gordon from 1980 to 1981.

In 2005, she was nominated for the Best Female Performance in a Soap Opera award at the international Rose d'Or television festival, but was beaten by fellow British actress Lesley-Anne Down.

In 2014 she became the lead in Night Terrace, a narrative comedy audio series in which she told TVTonight she plays "basically a female Doctor Who". The series was produced by Splendid Chaps Productions, with the first season released at the end of 2014. It won the Convenors' Award for Excellence in the 2014 Aurealis Awards. A second season was released in February 2016, also starring Woodburne. Both seasons have been licensed for broadcast, with the first commencing on BBC Radio 4 Extra on Sunday 21 April 2019 as part of The 7th Dimension programming block.

Woodburne appeared in a documentary special celebrating Neighbours 30th anniversary titled Neighbours 30th: The Stars Reunite, which aired in Australia and the UK in March 2015.

Filmography

References

External links 

Jackie Woodburne as Susan Kinski
Night Terrace website

1956 births
Living people
Actresses from Melbourne
People from Frankston, Victoria
Australian soap opera actresses
Northern Ireland emigrants to Australia
People from Carrickfergus
20th-century Australian actresses
21st-century Australian actresses